"Half of Me" is a song by American country music singers Thomas Rhett and Riley Green. It was released on June 6, 2022, as the second single from Rhett's sixth studio album Where We Started.

Content
Rhett wrote the song while on tour. He co-wrote with Will Bundy, Josh Thompson, and Rhett Akins, the latter of whom is Rhett's father. According to CMT, Thompson came up with the song's hook "half of me wants a cold beer / And the other half does too" while in a conversation with Rhett. They wrote the song in about half an hour. After it was completed, Rhett suggested adding Riley Green as a duet partner, because the two had become friends after hunting together.

The song is about a man who wants to consume alcohol instead of tending to his everyday chores. Carena Liptak of Taste of Country compared the song's sound to the country music of the 1990s.

Charts

Weekly charts

Year-end charts

References

2022 singles
2022 songs
Thomas Rhett songs
Riley Green (singer) songs
Songs written by Rhett Akins
Songs written by Thomas Rhett
Songs written by Josh Thompson (singer)
Song recordings produced by Dann Huff
Big Machine Records singles

Male vocal duets
Songs about alcohol